Pseudomonas mediterranea is a bacterium, similar to P. corrugata, that causes tomato pith necrosis. For the phylogenetic analysis of P. corrugata and its closely related phytopathogenic bacterium Pseudomonas mediterranea refer to Trantas et al. 2015.

References

External links
Type strain of Pseudomonas mediterranea at BacDive -  the Bacterial Diversity Metadatabase

Pseudomonadales
Bacteria described in 2002